The 1903 New York Giants season was the franchise's 21st season. The team finished in second place in the National League with an 84–55 record, 6.5 games behind the Pittsburgh Pirates— a dramatic improvement from their abysmal 48–88 record the previous season.

Regular season

Season standings

Record vs. opponents

Roster

Player stats

Batting

Starters by position 
Note: Pos = Position; G = Games played; AB = At bats; H = Hits; Avg. = Batting average; HR = Home runs; RBI = Runs batted in

Other batters 
Note: G = Games played; AB = At bats; H = Hits; Avg. = Batting average; HR = Home runs; RBI = Runs batted in

Pitching

Starting pitchers 
Note: G = Games pitched; IP = Innings pitched; W = Wins; L = Losses; ERA = Earned run average; SO = Strikeouts

Other pitchers 
Note: G = Games pitched; IP = Innings pitched; W = Wins; L = Losses; ERA = Earned run average; SO = Strikeouts

Relief pitchers 
Note: G = Games pitched; W = Wins; L = Losses; SV = Saves; ERA = Earned run average; SO = Strikeouts

External links
 1903 New York Giants season at Baseball Reference
 1903 New York Giants roster at Baseball Almanac

New York Giants (NL)
San Francisco Giants seasons
New York Giants season
New York G
1900s in Manhattan
Washington Heights, Manhattan